This is the list of festivals in Pakistan.

By region
Shandur Polo Festival
Festivals in Lahore
Festivals in Multan
Punjabi festivals (Pakistan)

Islamic

Public holidays in Pakistan
Public holidays in Pakistan

Festivals in Pakistan

Pakistan Day is a momentous milestone in the history of Pakistan movement. This event is held to mark the anniversary of Pakistan Resolution passed by the Muslims of South Asia on 23 March 1940 at Minto Park (now Iqbal Park), Lahore. The resolution was presented by A. K. Fazlul Huq. The nation commemorates this day with great zeal and enthusiasm, to honor the most outstanding achievement of the Muslims of South Asia who passed the historic Pakistan Resolution resulting in the creation of Pakistan under the dynamic leadership of Quaid-e-Azam Muhammad Ali Jinnah; a homeland where they could live in peace, harmony and in accordance with the tenets of Islam.
Chaand Raat 
Iqbal Day 
Quaid-e-Azam Day 
Pakistan Flower Show 
Yom-e Bab ul-Islam
Future Fest Pakistan

Literary festivals in Pakistan

Islamabad Literature Festival 
Karachi Literature Festival 
Lahore Literary Festival

Film festivals in Pakistan

Cinéaste One Student Film Festival 
Indus Telefilm Festival 
Kara Film Festival

Music festivals in Pakistan

All Pakistan Music Conference
Dosti Music Project

Technology Festivals in Pakistan 

 Future Fest Pakistan

Local events

Fairs 
 Mela Chiraghan, this fair is famous in Pakistan.
 Kalam summer festival

See also 
 Public holidays in Pakistan
 Culture of Pakistan

References

Fairs in Pakistan
 
 
Pakistan